Evarist Zhang Zhiliang (March 15, 1887 – May 26, 1932) was a Chinese Catholic priest and Vicar Apostolic of Jining between 1929 and 1932.

Biography

Evarist Zhang Zhiliang was born on March 15, 1887. He was ordained a priest on December 28, 1917. On February 2, 1929, Pope Pius XI appointed him Vicar Apostolic of Jining. On April 14 of that year he was consecrated in St. Peter's Basilica, Rome, by Willem Marinus van Rossum.

On May 26, 1932, he died in Jining, aged 45.

References

1887 births
1932 deaths
20th-century Roman Catholic bishops in China